This is a list of certified jazz recordings, which also represents best-selling jazz recordings.

Jazz recordings

Studio albums

Live albums

Compilation albums

Crossover jazz recordings

References 

Jazz discographies
Jazz
Jazz